T. S. Jaya was an Indian actress and singer. She was active in Tamil language films between 1937 and 1956. She was sometimes referred to as T. S. Jayarl.

Filmography

References

External links

 - A song rendered by T. S. Jaya from the film Sanyasi
 - She sings in Ithaya Geetham with K. Sarangapani

20th-century Indian actresses
Actresses in Tamil cinema
Indian women playback singers
Tamil playback singers
20th-century Indian singers
20th-century Indian women singers